Bradley Davies (born 9 January 1987) is a Welsh international rugby union player for the Ospreys in the Pro14. His is the son of the former lock for Pontypridd; Bleddyn Davies.

Career
Bradley's first position as a youngster was outside half where he played for Pontyclun juniors, at the age of 14 he then found his natural position at lock. Davies went on from there to play for Beddau youth and was a member of the Cardiff Blues academy before signing a professional contract with the Blues at 18.

International
Davies played for all age group levels for Wales and was captain of the under 20s squad when they won the Grand Slam in 2005.

In the summer of 2008 he was selected in the Welsh squad to tour South Africa but was not able to play due to injury. During the 2009 Six Nations Championship Davies made his Wales debut as a late replacement for Shane Williams against Scotland.

On 18 January 2010 he was named in the 35-man Wales national Squad for the 2010 Six Nations tournament.

On 26 February 2010, Davies played in a loss against France and there was a minutes silence in honour of his mother Cheryl who died aged 46 the week before.

In the 2012 Six Nations Championship, Davies was back in the red of Wales and started in their clash with Ireland in the opening match of the weekend. The lock, however, was at the centre of a controversial incident as he was sin-binned for 'tip-tackling' Donnacha Ryan. Following this incident the player was cited by match officials and subsequently received a 7-week ban for foul play.

During the All Blacks end of year European Tour, controversy arose during the Wales vs. New Zealand test match on 24 November 2012. Within the first minute of the game, All Blacks hooker Andrew Hore swung his right arm, hitting Davies hard in the jaw from behind and knocking him unconscious. This incident was missed by referee Craig Joubert and his touch-judges, and no action towards Hore was taken on the field, however it is expected that Hore will face the judiciary for his actions and he may face an end of season suspension. This incident resulted in Davies being taken off of the field and taken to a hospital for further concussion assessment.

Davies was selected as Wales captain for the two match tour of Japan in June 2013.

Personal history
On Saturday 9 April 2011 Bradley Davies was arrested in Saundersfoot, Wales for his involvement in a pub brawl.

References

External links
Cardiff Blues profile
Wales profile

1987 births
Living people
Cardiff Rugby players
Rugby union locks
Rugby union players from Llantrisant
Wales international rugby union players
Welsh rugby union players
Wasps RFC players
Ospreys (rugby union) players